The 2017 BSWW Mundialito is a beach soccer tournament that takes place at Praia de Carcavelos in Cascais, Portugal, from 21 July to 23 July 2017. This competition with 4 teams was played in a round-robin format.

Participating nations
 (host)

Standings

Schedule and results

Winners

Awards

See also
Beach soccer
BSWW Mundialito
Euro Beach Soccer League

References

External links
Beach Soccer Worldwide

BSWW Mundialito
BSW
2017 in beach soccer